Bedros Bedrosian (born 21 May 1955) is a retired male triple jumper from Romania. His personal best jump was 17.27 metres, achieved in June 1984 in Bucharest. This ranks him second among Romanian triple jumpers, only behind Marian Oprea.

He finished fourteenth at the 1980 European Indoor Championships and sixth at the 1982 European Championships in Athletics. He became national champion five times in a row, from 1980 through 1984.

After retiring he became a coach. He was hired as jumping coach for the Saudi Arabian national team, notably training Hussein Taher Al-Sabee and Mohamed Salman Al-Khuwalidi.

Achievements

References

1955 births
Living people
Romanian male triple jumpers
Romanian athletics coaches